At the 1908 Summer Olympics, three archery events were contested.  Great Britain sent 41 archers (25 female and 16 male), France sent 15 men, and the United States sent one man.

Medal summary

Participating nations
57 archers from 3 nations competed.

Medal table

References

Sources
 Official Report of the Games of the IV Olympiad (1908).
 De Wael, Herman. Herman's Full Olympians: "Archery 1908". Accessed 8 April 2006.

 
1908 Summer Olympics events
1908
1908 in archery
International archery competitions hosted by the United Kingdom